The 2017 Fall United Premier Soccer League season was the 9th season of the UPSL.

Western Conference

Western Pro Premier
The following 7 clubs left the division before the season
Avalanche FC
L.A. Highlanders FC
Mesoamerica FC
Newhall Premier — relegated to Championship Division
Ozzy's Laguna FC
San Nicolas FC
USA Soccer Stars FC

The following 5 clubs joined the division before the season
Bell Gardens FC — promoted from Championship Division
OC Invicta FC — new reserve team of North American Soccer League club
Orange County FC 2 — new reserve team of National Premier Soccer League club
San Diego Zest FC 2 — new reserve team of Premier Development League club
Vanquish FC — new team

Standings

Playoffs

OC Invicta FC advance to the national playoffs.

Santa Ana Winds FC advance to the national playoffs.

Western Championship
The following 6 clubs left the division before the season
Bell Gardens FC — promoted to Pro Premier Division
FC Golden State Force U23
High Desert United
Irvine Outcasts SC
L.A. Sharks FC
OC Crew SC

The following 8 clubs joined the division before the season
Black Gold Oil FC — new team
L.A. Roma FC — new team
Lionside FC — joined from South Bay Sports League
Long Beach City FC — returned from 3 season hiatus
Newcastle United FC — returned from 1 season hiatus
Newhall Premier — relegated from Championship Division
Pacific Side FC — new team
San Fernando Valley FC

The following  club was rebranded before the season
L.A. Wolves FC (Reserves) rebranded from L.A. W17 FC

Standings

Promotion Playoffs

Panamerican FC was promoted to the Pro Premier Division.

Wild West Conference
The following 3 clubs left the conference before the season
Boise FC — transferred to Desert Mountain Conference
IFX Ballistic
Magic Valley FC

Wild West Blue Division
The following club joined the division before the season
Azteca FC

Standings

Wild West Red Division
The following 3 clubs joined the division before the season
Dynamos FC
East Bay FC Stompers Juniors
JASA RWC

Standings

Wild West Playoffs

East Bay FC Stompers Juniors advance to the national playoffs.

Real San Jose advance to the national playoffs.

Desert Mountain Conference
The following 8 clubs joined the conference for its inaugural season
Boise FC — transferred from Northwest Conference
Las Vegas City FC — transferred from Nevada Conference
Las Vegas Mobsters — transferred from Nevada Conference
Las Vegas Soccer Club
Logan United FC
Provo Premier
San Juan FC
Sporting AZ FC — transferred from Arizona Conference

Standings

Playoffs

Boise FC advance to the national playoffs.

Las Vegas Soccer Club advance to the national playoffs.

Colorado Conference

Colorado Pro Premier
The Pro Premier Division consisted of the same 8 clubs as in the previous season.

Standings

Playoffs

Indios Denver FC advance to the national playoffs.

Colorado Championship Division
The following 5 clubs joined the division for its inaugural season
Denver Metro FC
GAM United FC
Indios Denver FC U23
Legions FC
Northern Colorado FC

Standings

South Florida Conference
The following 7 clubs joined the conference for its inaugural season
Broncos United FC
FC Ginga
Hialeah City FC
Miami Dade FC Elite
Miami Wolves FC
Plantation FC
West Park FC

Standings

Playoffs

FC Ginga advance to the national playoffs.

National Playoffs

References

United Premier Soccer League seasons
2017 in American soccer leagues
2018 in American soccer leagues